25th Parallel is an American lifestyle magazine. The magazine is named after the 25th parallel north, a circle of latitude that passes through Florida.

Notable alumni
 Brian Warner, better known today as Marilyn Manson, worked for the magazine in the late-1980s writing music articles.

References

Lifestyle magazines published in the United States
Magazines with year of establishment missing
Local interest magazines published in the United States
Magazines published in Florida